The 2011 St Helens Metropolitan Borough Council election took place on 5 May 2011 to elect members of St Helens Metropolitan Borough Council in Merseyside, England. One third of the council was up for election and the Labour Party stayed in overall control of the council.

After the election, the composition of the council was:
Labour 35
Liberal Democrats 9
Conservative 4

Background
At the last election in 2010 Labour took control of the council with 28 seats after gaining 5 seats, while the Liberal Democrats dropped to 15 seats and the Conservatives were reduced to 5 seats. Labour were expected to make more gains in 2011, with the Liberal Democrats in particular expected to suffer from being in a coalition government with the Conservatives nationally.

Both Labour and the Liberal Democrats were defending 7 seats in 2011, while the Conservatives defended 2 seats. Other candidates at the election included 4 from the Green Party, who had not put candidates up in previous elections.

Election result
Labour increased its majority on the council after gaining 7 seats, including 6 from the Liberal Democrats. This took Labour to 35 councillors, while reducing the Liberal Democrats to 9 seats on the council, with the only Liberal Democrat to be elected being Michael Haw in Eccleston. Meanwhile, the wife of the Conservative group leader, Nancy Ashcroft, lost her seat on the council in Windle to Labour, reducing the Conservatives to 4 seats on the council.

Ward results

References

2011 English local elections
2011
2010s in Merseyside